Forty-and-Eight boxcars, commonly referred to as Forty-and-Eights, were types of French boxcars (voiture) used by the French Army and Wehrmacht. Doughboys were transported to the Western Front in the boxcars marked with "40-8" to denote its capacity to hold 40 men or 8 horses.

History
Introduced in the 1870s, they were drafted into military service by the French Army in both world wars. Between 1940 and 1944 occupying German forces used forty-and-eights to transport troops, POWs, horses, freight, and civilian prisoners to concentration camps. Following the Allied landing at Normandy in June, 1944, the Germans were pushed eastward towards the Rhine. Trains of forty-and-eights were frequent targets of opportunity for Allied fighter-bombers, with carloads of prisoners occasionally being victimized. As France was liberated forty-and-eights were used to transport Allied soldiers and materials to the shifting front through War's end in 1945.

Merci Train boxcars

In 1949, France sent 49 forty-and-eights to the United States laden with donations from citizens of France in thanks for the U.S.' role in the liberation of France, one for each of the then forty-eight states and one for Washington, D.C., and Hawaii to share. Called the Merci Train, it was sent in response to the Friendship Train America had created two years earlier to aid France in the dire immediate aftermath of World War II; 700 boxcars worth of donated supplies were collected across the U.S. and shipped across the Atlantic via donated transport.

External links 

Freight rolling stock
Rolling stock of France